, provisional designation , is an asteroid on an eccentric orbit, classified as near-Earth object and potentially hazardous asteroid of the Apollo group, approximately 3 kilometers in diameter. It was discovered on 9 December 2001, by astronomers of the LINEAR program at Lincoln Laboratory's Experimental Test Site near Socorro, New Mexico, in the United States. The asteroid is one of the largest potentially hazardous asteroids.

Orbit and classification 

 orbits the Sun at a distance of 0.98–2.52 AU once every 2 years and 4 months (848 days; semi-major axis of 1.75 AU). Its orbit has an eccentricity of 0.44 and an inclination of 42° with respect to the ecliptic. The body's observation arc begins with a precovery taken by the Sloan Digital Sky Survey in February 2000.

 is a member of the Apollo asteroids, the largest subgroup of near-Earth asteroids which cross the orbit of Earth. It is also a Mars-crosser, as it crosses the orbit of the Red Planet at 1.66 AU.

Close approaches 

With an absolute magnitude of 15.2,  is one of the brightest and presumably largest known potentially hazardous asteroid (see PHA-list). On 29 July 2054, this asteroid will make its closest near-Earth encounter of the 21st century at a nominal distance of 0.079 AU (31.1 LD).

Physical characteristics 

According to the survey carried out by the NEOWISE mission of NASA's Wide-field Infrared Survey Explorer,  measures 3.006 kilometers in diameter and its surface has an albedo of 0.178.

As of 2018, no rotational lightcurve of  has been obtained from photometric observations. The asteroid's rotation period, spin axis and shape remain unknown. In addition, the body's spectral type has never been assessed.

Numbering and naming 

This minor planet was numbered by the Minor Planet Center on 19 October 2005. As of 2018, it has not been named.

References

External links 
 Asteroid Lightcurve Database (LCDB), query form (info )
 Asteroids and comets rotation curves, CdR – Observatoire de Genève, Raoul Behrend
 
 
 

111253
111253
111253
20011209